The plant mir-166 microRNA precursor is a small non-coding RNA gene. This microRNA (miRNA) has now been predicted or experimentally confirmed in a wide range of plant species. microRNAs are transcribed as ~70 nucleotide precursors and subsequently processed by the Dicer enzyme to give a ~22 nucleotide product.  In this case the mature sequence comes from the 3' arm of the precursor, and both Arabidopsis thaliana and rice genomes contain a number of related miRNA precursors which give rise to almost identical mature sequences.  The mature products are thought to have regulatory roles through complementarity to messenger RNA.

References

External links 
 
 MIPF0000004

MicroRNA